Francesco Sanetti (born 11 January 1979 in Rome) is an Italian former professional footballer who last played for Colleferro Calcio as a striker.

Career
Sheffield Wednesday signed Sanetti on a free transfer from Genoa on 30 April 1998. He made his debut as a substitute and scored a late consolation goal against Aston Villa in a 3–1 defeat on 2 May 1998.

He was rewarded for his debut performance with a starting role in the next game against Crystal Palace, but left the club in July in the following year having just made a single start in five appearances, scoring one goal in the process.

References

External links

1979 births
Living people
Italian footballers
Serie B players
Premier League players
Genoa C.F.C. players
Sheffield Wednesday F.C. players
U.S. Livorno 1915 players
Atletico Roma F.C. players
S.S. Teramo Calcio players
L'Aquila Calcio 1927 players
Expatriate footballers in England
Italian expatriate sportspeople in England
Italian expatriate footballers
Association football forwards